Your Cheatin' Heart is the second studio album by American musician Hank Williams Jr. The full title is: The MGM Sound Track Album Hank Williams' Life Story – The MGM Film Your Cheatin' Heart Sung by Hank Williams Jr.  The album number is E/SE-4260.

Track listing
All tracks composed by Hank Williams

Side one
 "Your Cheatin' Heart" – 2:04
 "Hey Good Lookin'" – 1:38
 "I Saw the Light" – 1:22
 "Jambalaya (On the Bayou)" – 1:55
 "Ramblin' Man" – 1:20
 "I'm So Lonesome I Could Cry" – 2:12

Side two
 "Jambalaya (On the Bayou)" – 1:28
 "Cold, Cold Heart" – 2:17
 "Kaw-Liga" – 1:05
 "I Can't Help It (If I'm Still in Love with You)" – 1:58
 "Hey Good Lookin'" – 2:41
 "Long Gone Lonesome Blues" – 1:45
 "You Win Again" – 2:02

Personnel
Hank Williams Jr. - vocals
The Jordanaires - backing vocals
Bob Moore - bass
Buddy Harman - drums
Harold Bradley, Ray Edenton, Jerry Kennedy, Grady Martin - guitar
Bill Pursell, Hargus "Pig" Robbins - piano
Pete Drake - steel guitar
Technical
Val Valentin – director of engineering
Frederick Karger – supervision

External links
 Hank Williams Jr.'s official website

1964 albums
Hank Williams Jr. albums
MGM Records albums